Naitar is a village in Kamrup, situated in north bank of river Brahmaputra .

Transport
Naitar is accessible through National Highway 31. All major private commercial vehicles ply between Naitar and nearby towns.

See also
 Nahira
 Pachim Samaria

References

Villages in Kamrup district